4+1 Ensemble is an album by American keyboardist and composer Wayne Horvitz recorded in 1996 and released on the German Intuition label. The name of the group refers to its membership: four men playing standard musical instruments, plus an additional person processing their performances with various electronic effects in real-time.

Reception
The Allmusic review awarded the album 4 stars.

Track listing

Recorded at Bear Creek Studios in Seattle, Washington in 1996

Personnel
Wayne Horvitz - piano, keyboards
Tucker Martine - audio processing
Julian Priester - trombone
Eyvind Kang - violin
Reggie Watts - keyboards

References

Wayne Horvitz albums
1998 albums